Jack of All Games, Inc. was an American distributor of video games and video game-related hardware based in West Chester Township, Ohio. Founded by David Rosenbaum in 1989, the company was sold to Take-Two Interactive in August 1998. Through a series of acquisitions and mergers, Jack of All Games expanded by nine further offices in nine different countries between February and October 1999. Following an outsourcing deal in October 2008, the company was sold to Synnex in February 2010, where it was merged into Synnex' New Age Electronics division.

History 
Jack of All Games was founded by David Rosenbaum in 1989, based in West Chester Township, Ohio.

In February 1999, Take-Two Interactive combined various of their international distribution outlets into Jack of All Games: Alliance Inventory Management (based in New York City) became Jack of All Games NY, LDA Distribution (London and Paris) became Jack of All Games UK and Jack of All Games France, and Directsoft (Sydney) became Jack of All Games Australia. The new offices were followed up by Funsoft Nordic (Oslo, Copenhagen and Stockholm), which was acquired by Take-Two Interactive in March 1999 and subsequently renamed Jack of All Games Scandinavia. An office in Munich, Germany, was opened on July 1, 1999. Triad Distributors and Global Star Software, respectively a software distributor and a budget-range game publisher, both of which were founded in 1993 by Craig McGauley and Damian Cristiani, and operated under the same management team and from the same facilities in Concord, Ontario, were acquired by Take-Two Interactive in September 1999 and combined into Jack of All Games Canada. In October 1999, Take-Two Interactive acquired Italian publisher CD Verte, which became Jack of All Games Italy.

On September 9, 2008, Take-Two Interactive announced that, effective immediately, all Jack of All Games operations, including all employees and their West Chester office lease, would be outsourced to Ditan, the distribution arm of Cinram.

In October 2008, Robert Alexander, the president of Jack of All Games at the time of its acquisition, filed a complaint with the United States District Court for the District of Nevada against Take-Two Interactive executives Paul Eibler and Richard Roedel, who Alexander alleged had implemented a scheme that procedurally lowered his compensation as a key employee for the company.

According to Ben Feder, chief executive officer for the company the time, Take-Two Interactive wanted to shift their focus to their "core business strategy"—video game publishing. The acquisition closed on February 26, 2010, and Jack of All Games was effectively merged into Synnex' New Age Electronics division.

References 

1989 establishments in Ohio
1998 mergers and acquisitions
2010 disestablishments in Ohio
2010 mergers and acquisitions
Defunct companies based in Ohio
Take-Two Interactive divisions and subsidiaries
Video game companies disestablished in 2010
Video game companies established in 1989
Defunct video game companies of the United States
Video game development companies